William Martin Wetzel (born January 29, 1958) is a former American football linebacker in the National Football League (NFL) who played for the New York Jets. He played college football at Tulane University.

References 

1958 births
Living people
East Jefferson High School alumni
Players of American football from New Orleans
American football linebackers
Tulane Green Wave football players
New York Jets players